Andrew James Parfitt  is the 5th Vice-Chancellor and President of the University of Technology Sydney. He was appointed to the role in November 2021. He was previously the Deputy Vice-Chancellor (Academic) of the University of Newcastle from 2012 to 2016, and Provost of the University of Technology Sydney from 2017 to 2021.

Education

Parfitt graduated with a BE (Electrical and Electronic) and PhD (Electrical and Electronic Engineering) from the University of Adelaide.

Career

Parfitt was previously the CEO of CRC Satellite Systems and General Manager of CSIRO space programs. In 2004, he was appointed as the Director of the Institute for Telecommunications Research at the University of South Australia. He has held adjunct academic positions at the University of Adelaide, University of Sydney and Macquarie University.

In December 2012, Parfitt was appointed as the Deputy Vice-Chancellor (Academic) of the University of Newcastle. He remained in the role until 2016, when he was appointed as the next provost of the University of Technology Sydney.

Parfitt was the Chair of the Universities Admissions Centre from 2013 to 2019.

Parfitt was the Provost and Senior Vice-President of the University of Technology Sydney from 2017 to 2021. In November 2021, he was appointed as the Vice-Chancellor and President of the University of Technology Sydney.

Honours

Parfitt was a ministerial appointment to the Australian government's Space Industry Innovation Council from 2010 to 2012. He is a Senior Member of the Institute of Electrical and Electronics Engineers (IEEE) and a Fellow of Engineers Australia (EA). He was elected a Fellow of the Australian Academy of Technology and Engineering in 2021.

References 

Australian academic administrators
Academic staff of the University of Technology Sydney
Fellow Members of the IEEE
Living people
CSIRO people
Year of birth missing (living people)
Fellows of the Australian Academy of Technological Sciences and Engineering